Seruvila electoral district was an electoral district of Sri Lanka between July 1977 and February 1989. The district was named after the town of Seruvila in Trincomalee District, Eastern Province. The 1978 Constitution of Sri Lanka introduced the proportional representation electoral system for electing members of Parliament. The existing 160 mainly single-member electoral districts were replaced with 22 multi-member electoral districts. Seruvila electoral district was replaced by the Trincomalee multi-member electoral district at the 1989 general elections, the first under the PR system, though Seruvila continues to be a polling division of the multi-member electoral district.

Members of Parliament
Key

Elections

1977 Parliamentary General Election
Results of the 8th parliamentary election held on 21 July 1977 for the district:

References

Former electoral districts of Sri Lanka
Politics of Trincomalee District